Etude de la Population Africaine/African Population Studies is a peer-reviewed academic journal covering original research on African populations, development, and related fields. It was established in 1986 and is published by the Union for African Population Studies. The editor-in-chief is Clifford Odimegwu (University of the Witwatersrand).

External links 
 
 Journal page on Union for African Population Studies

References 

Sociology journals
Publications established in 1986
Open access journals
Biannual journals
Multilingual journals
Academic journals published by learned and professional societies